A Practice Enterprise (also known as a Practice Firm1 or Virtual Enterprise2) is a practice company that runs like a real business silhouetting a real enterprise's business procedures, products and services. A Practice Enterprise resembles a real company in its form, organization and function. Each Practice Enterprise trades with other Practice Enterprises, following standard commercial business procedures in the Practice Enterprise worldwide economic environment. It offers a ‘learning-by-doing’ training programme with the aim to better prepare young people for their future careers and to increase their entrepreneurship potential through running their own Practice Enterprise.

History
The origins of the Practice Enterprise concept run back to the late 19th Century. Letter exchange clubs were formed in Europe as a way of training commercial communication. The letter exchange clubs became more and more popular and turned into the first practice bureaus around 1920 and were used in a number of countries across Europe.

The first structure to the practice bureaus was the “German Practice Economy” in 1934 and in 1948, the first central office for Practice Enterprises was established by the German Trade Unions. Thereby, a real practice firm market was formed which offered for example a database to connect, bank services resembling real bank systems, mail exchanges and trades with other countries, such as Austria, Sweden and Switzerland. In the 1960s, the first central office organising the services provided to the network was formed in the city of Heidelberg in Germany and the first fair for Practice Firms was held in a gymnastic hall in Northern Germany in 1964.

In 1993, a European project was funded by the European Social Fund and the German Federal State of North Rhine-Westphalia to connect the different networks around the world to an international association. The European project established the non-profit association EUROPEN which at that time was a department of the Bfz-Essen e.V. in Germany. As the association grew internationally and became an independent entity in 1997, it adjusted its name in 2005 to EUROPEN-PEN International emphasizing the members from across the world. Since 2021, the international association updated its name from EUROPEN-PEN International and becomes PEN Worldwide.

Concept, Methodology and Skills 
The Practice Enterprise concept is applied in different educational systems: from schools, colleges, universities, vocational training institutions3, companies and further training centres worldwide. The primary target group is students from secondary schools and universities. Adults can also participate in the training programme, either as employees, jobseekers, and people with disabilities or women returning to work.

This applied way of learning, the ‘learning-by-doing’4 methodology, allows people with all kinds of backgrounds to learn and improve their skills in a Practice Enterprise. Trainees get to know the real-life international business experience and learn and improve important skills such as language and communication skills, intercultural competences and various soft skills which are helpful in finding one’s own path and increase the employability.

Trainees learn many different entrepreneurship skills5 such as Administration skills, Accountancy, Computer-based skills (ICT), Human resources management, Marketing and Sales, Purchasing, Business planning, International trade, and Time management. In addition, they also develop the necessary competences to become a better employee or entrepreneur, such as teamwork, problem solving, taking responsibility and developing self-initiative. Because of the international nature of the programme, trainees also learn about intercultural differences when doing business and additionally they have the opportunity to increase their language skills. The skills and competences gained in a Practice Enterprise can easily be transferred and adjusted to other markets, countries and potential work fields.

Training Environment and Activities 
Generally a Practice Enterprise has the same key players and benefits wherever it is located. The trainees are the employees of the Practice Enterprise and run the business themselves whereas the teacher or trainer takes on the role of a mentor or coach.

The setting of a Practice Enterprise provides a way for trainees to learn practically through the ‘learning-by-doing’ methodology and also to get into the entrepreneurial mindset. The Practice Enterprise programme is designed in such a way that trainees take the responsibility for operating a virtual company and for the sale of products (for example pharmaceuticals, books, food, machinery) and services (for example, shipping, warehousing, events, travel, catering services) and for the revenues and expenditures of their company. Each company engages in business activities, both nationally and internationally with other companies within the Practice Enterprise network (for example, between Brazil and Spain), by following standard commercial business procedures and frameworks.

Each company carries out market research, places advertisements, buys raw materials and stock, plans logistics, manufactures simulated goods, sells simulated goods or services and pays wages, taxes, benefits, etc. The actual transfer of goods and money happens virtually but the following transactions take place for real: orders are made, invoices issued and financial records maintained, including information about creditors, debtors, stock holders, etc.

All trainers involved in the Practice Enterprise programme are trained on workplace facilitation. Trainers receive guidelines and practical handbooks to run the programme and to assess the trainees based on the same set of criteria. Trainers in a Practice Enterprise take on the role of a coach or mentor for trainees, instead of the traditional teacher role.

Most Practice Enterprises have a mentor company that comes from the real business world. A business mentor gives advice and ideas to the trainers and trainees about how a business is run and can advise on the sale of products and services within the virtual business. In some cases, business mentors are involved in the selection and recruitment of staff (e.g. students within the school or university).

There are standard requirements regarding equipment and IT (hardware and software) that need to be met for running the programme. To make the experience as realistic as possible, each classroom is divided into different sections that represent the different departments of a business such as reception, purchasing, human resources, operations and marketing.

Fairs for Practice Enterprises exist nationally as well as internationally and provide a good base to experience and test skills in another setting than the classroom or office. Through the participation in Practice Enterprise Trade Fairs, trainees get to represent their business to other national and international Practice Enterprises in person and also learn the preparation of a fair and booth, the professional representation in front of competitors and the follow-up after trades on the fair ground. During these fairs, a lot of competitions take place, varying from ‘Best Booth’ to other business challenges like elevator pitches and case studies.

See also
Business simulation
Vocational training
Adult education
Employability
Education
Life skills
Training
Literacy
Study skills and Soft Skills
Entrepreneurship
Long-term unemployment and structural unemployment
TVET
NEET
Empowerment

External links 
PEN Worldwide e.V.

Virtual Enterprises International

Deutscher ÜbungsFirmenRing Zentralstelle

Fundació Inform

ACTIF

Helvartis

References
1.  "What is a practice firm?". Canadian Practice Firms Network. Retrieved 30 May 2015.

2.  Alderman, Liz (29 May 2015). "In Europe, Fake Jobs Can Have Real Benefits". The New York Times - International Business. The New York Times company. Retrieved 30 May 2015.

3. “Vocational Education”. Retrieved 12 June 2018.

4. Paniagua, A. and D. Istance (2018), “Teachers as Designers of Learning Environments: The Importance of Innovative Pedagogies, Educational Research and Innovation”, OECD Publishing, Paris. Retrieved 7 June 2018.

5. “Skills Panorama: Inspiring Choices on Skills and Jobs in Europe”, CEDEFOP. Retrieved 11 June 2018.

Management education
Vocational education